Robert Wilson is a former football (soccer) player who represented New Zealand at international level.

Wilson made a solitary official international appearance for the All Whites in a 0–4 loss to Australia on 4 September 1948

References 

Year of birth missing (living people)
Living people
New Zealand association footballers
New Zealand international footballers
Association footballers not categorized by position